The Cheshire Wire are an English basketball club, based in the town of Warrington in the northwest of England.

History
Following the demise of the Cheshire Jets BBL franchise in second half of 2012, junior basketball in the area was experiencing an extended period of uncertainty.

The continuation of junior national league basketball in the county was guaranteed when the Cheshire Wire Basketball Club was formally founded by Mike Halpin in the spring of 2013 . 

Initially providing junior basketball for the area, the club went from strength-to-strength, winning national titles and regularly competing with the powerhouses of English junior basketball. 

Building on the success of the junior teams and to provide a pathway into senior basketball, the club entered into the Men's English Basketball League for the first time in 2018. The club's focus, however, remained to develop an elite-level junior program.

The club's nickname is derived from the wire-making industry that the town of Warrington was once famous for.

Honours
U18 Men's North Premier Champions and National Runners-Up 2014-15
U16 Men's North Premier Champions and National Cup Champions 2015-16
U16 Men's National Runners-Up 2016-17

Home Venue
Birchwood Leisure Complex

Season-by-season records

References

Basketball teams in England